Opus Dei and Catholic Church Leaders discusses the comments and observations of popes, cardinals, and other leaders of the Catholic Church as regards the Personal Prelature of the Holy Cross and Opus Dei.

Opus Dei and the popes

Pope John XXIII lauded Opus Dei and said on 5 March 1960 that it opens up "unsuspected horizons of apostolate," while Paul VI said that the Work is "an expression of the perennial youth of the Church, fully open to the exigencies of a modern apostolate." (Handwritten letter to Msgr. Josemaría Escrivá de Balaguer, 1 October 1964)

Before the start of his brief papacy, John Paul I said  that Escrivá's teachings are "radical; he goes as far as talking about "materializing" --in a good sense-- the quest for holiness. For him, it is the material work itself which must be turned into prayer and sanctity."

John Paul II stated “[Opus Dei] has as its aim the sanctification of one’s life, while remaining within the world at one’s place of work and profession: to live the Gospel in the world, while living immersed in the world, but in order to transform it, and to redeem it with one’s personal love for Christ. This is truly a great ideal, which right from the beginning has anticipated the theology of the lay state, which is a characteristic mark of the Church of the Council and after the Council.” L’Osservatore Romano, August 27, 1979. He established Opus Dei as a Personal Prelature in 1982 and the Pontifical University of the Holy Cross in 1990, and canonized its founder in 2002. He also said upon  creating Opus Dei as a personal prelature, “With very great hope, the Church directs its attention and maternal care to Opus Dei, which -- by divine inspiration --the Servant of God Josemaría Escrivá de Balaguer founded in Madrid on October 2, 1928, so that it may always be an apt and effective instrument of the salvific mission which the Church carries out for the life of the world. From its beginnings, this Institution has in fact striven, not only to illuminate with new lights the mission of the laity in the Church and in society, but also to put it into practice.” Ut Sit, November 1982 (the apostolic constitution by which Opus Dei was made a personal prelature of the Catholic Church in accord with Code of Canon Law sections 294-97).

In the "Address to Theological Study Convention on the Teaching of Blessed Josemaria Escriva," October 14, 1993, John Paul II stated: "In the 65 years since its foundation, the Prelature of Opus Dei, an indissoluble unity of priests and lay people, has contributed to making Christ's saving message resound in many walks of life. As Pastor of the universal Church, echoes of this apostolate reach me. I encourage all the members of the Prelature of Opus Dei to persevere in this work, in faithful continuity with the spirit of service to the Church which always inspired the life of your founder." 

Benedict XVI, three years before becoming Pope, said "the theocentrism of Escrivá...means this confidence in the fact that God is working now and we ought only to put ourselves at his disposal...This, for me, is a message of greatest importance. It is a message that leads to overcoming what could be considered the great temptation of our times: the pretense that after the 'big bang' God retired from history."

Catholic faith and Opus Dei teachings

John Paul II said Opus Dei "anticipated the theology of the lay state, which is a characteristic mark of the Church of the Council and after the Council." The Catholic Church's Second Vatican Council states: 
"All the faithful, whatever their condition or state, are called by the Lord, each in his own way, to that perfect holiness whereby the Father Himself is perfect (Mt 5:48)." "It belongs to the laity to seek the kingdom of God by engaging in the affairs of the world and directing them according to God's will." 

With Escriva's teaching that God comes close to us and we can cooperate with his plan of salvation, John Paul II said that "it is easier to understand what the Second Vatican Council affirmed: 'there is no question, then, of the Christian message inhibiting men from building up the world ... on the contrary it is an incentive to do these very things' (Vatican II, Gaudium et spes, n. 34)." 

The biblical concept that everyone is called to sanctity was already enunciated by Augustine of Hippo, Francis of Sales, and Alphonsus Liguori, but their emphasis was on prayer and liturgical devotions, basically monastic spirituality applied to lay people. "Escrivá is more radical," writes Cardinal Luciani (1977), who later became John Paul I. "For him, it is the material work itself which must be turned into prayer and sanctity," thus providing a lay spirituality for lay people to attain holiness. Thus, Sebastiano Baggio, Cardinal Prefect of the Congregation for Bishops, states that Escrivá is a "turning point in the history of Christian spirituality. "The "absolute novelty" of Opus Dei, says Cardinal Franz König (1975), the perceived leader of the "progressivists" in Vatican II, lies in teaching that the two separated worlds of religious life and professional life "should in fact walk together." On a deeper level, the "great originality" of Opus Dei's message, states José Saraiva Martins (2002), is based on the teaching that all of creation has been sanctified by the God-become-flesh: movies, boardrooms, gardens, sports can and should lead to God. In this Christian materialism, as Escrivá calls it, Christians leading an integral life of prayer and mortification are called to "passionately love the world" and to overcome the "enemies of sanctity": greed, lust and egoism. 

In the work of spreading a message that to many seems new, Opus Dei faced challenges, misunderstandings and controversies, leading some Catholic leaders like Cardinal John Carmel Heenan to see Opus Dei as a sign of contradiction, a "sign that is spoken against" (Lk 2:34).   

In the 1940s, some Jesuits led by Fr. Ángel Carrillo de Albornoz, who later left the Society of Jesus, denounced Opus Dei's teachings as "a new heresy." It is not orthodox, they said, to teach that the laity can be holy without public vows and distinctive clothing. Also, these critics were concerned that Opus Dei would take away vocations from the religious orders. 

Based on reports from Spain, the Superior General of the Society of Jesus, Fr. Wlodimir Ledóchowski (1866–1942), told the Vatican he considered Opus Dei "very dangerous for the Church in Spain." He described it as having a "secretive character" and saw "signs in it of a covert inclination to dominate the world with a form of Christian Masonry." This attack against Opus Dei from within well-regarded ecclesiastical circles ("the opposition by good people," Escrivá called it), which happened time and again in its history, is considered the root of present-day accusations coming from the most varied quarters. This is the conclusion of a number of writers, including John L. Allen Jr., a Catholic American journalist, in his work Opus Dei: an Objective Look Behind the Myths and Reality of the Most Controversial Force in the Catholic Church (2005). 

Some time after the end of the Second Vatican Council, Opus Dei critics started stating that it has an ultraconservative and reactionary vision of the Roman Catholic faith. In contrast, Messori and Allen state that the Opus Dei prelature does not have any doctrine other than what the Catholic Church teaches. Catholic thinkers such as George Weigel say the use of conservative, a political category, on religious, moral, or intellectual matters is "implausible and distorting." These should be categorised, they say, as either faithful or heretical, good or evil, true or false. The "handing on" (traditio) of "living faith," writes Weigel, has the "capacity to inspire innovative thinking." Opus Dei is the perfect storm, says Allen: It has become the center of the debate in the post-Vatican II polarization in Catholic politics.

The late Hans Urs von Balthasar, considered one of the greatest theologians of the 20th century, discussed Opus Dei in an article entitled "Fundamentalism," describing it as "a concentration of fundamentalist power in the Church." (article in Wort und Wahrheit, 1963).  He based his negative views on his reading of some points of Escriva's main book, The Way, which von Balthasar did not consider of sufficient spiritual depth for its worldwide goals. On the other hand, V. Messori, who studied the von Balthasar issue, says that the theologian later retracted his views after more in-depth study and after meeting members of Opus Dei. He even defended Opus Dei against attacks.

Footnotes

References
Published testimonials on Opus Dei, mostly from Church officials

Opus Dei